Constant Camber 32 is a  high performance day-racing / fast cruiser sloop trimaran sailboat designed in the 1970s for protected water and featuring berths for two adults.

See also
 List of multihulls

References

Trimarans